Straight pool, which is also called 14.1 continuous and 14.1 rack, is a cue sport in which two competing players attempt to  as many billiard balls as possible without playing a . The game was the primary version of pool played in professional competition until it was superseded by faster-playing games like nine-ball and eight-ball in the 1980s.

In straight pool, the player may  and attempt to pocket any object ball on the table regardless of its number or color until only one object ball and the  remain, at which point the other fourteen balls are re-racked. At this point, play resumes with the objective of pocketing the remaining ball in a manner that causes the cue ball to carom into the rack, spreading out the balls and allowing the player to continue the run. The goal is to reach a set number of points that is determined by agreement before the game begins; traditionally 100 points is needed for a win, though professional matches may be higher. One point is scored by pocketing an object ball without a foul, while a point is deducted on a foul.

The game was most popular in the United States and is notably played in the 1961 film The Hustler. The World Straight Pool Championship was held from 1912 until 1990. The modern incarnation was held from 2006 until ending in 2010. The game is currently represented at a continental level in events such as the American Straight Pool Championship and the European Pool Championship 14.1.

History

As players became skilled in scoring dozens of points in a single turn, they would often use defensive shots on the break to avoid their opponent potting the 15 balls on the table.

In 1910, Jerome Keogh, who won numerous continuous pool tournaments, wanted to increase the attacking nature from the break-off shot. This new game became known as "14.1 continuous" and "14.1 rack", and in 1912 it became known as straight pool. The game quickly overtook continuous pool in popularity and was the most-played version of pool until Nine-ball and Eight-ball became popular.

Gameplay
Other balls are placed at random and must touch adjacent balls.

Unlike most pool games, the object of straight pool's standard initial break shot is to leave the opponent without the chance to pot a ball. All shots—including the break shot—in straight pool require , in which both the ball and pocket are called before the shot is taken. On the break, either the cue ball and two other balls must touch a rail, or have a ball pocketed. The failure to accomplish either of these conditions results in a foul. Fouling on the initial break incurs a penalty loss of two points. In addition, the opponent has the choice of either accepting the table in position or of having the balls  and requiring the offending player to repeat the opening break. All other fouls made during the game incur a one-point deduction, and a player incurs an additional 15-point penalty for committing three consecutive fouls.

The unique feature of straight pool is the racking that is played when one ball remains. These intra-game racks have a specific set of rules; when the rack is supposed to be replaced, if neither the cue ball nor the object ball remain in the rack area, the balls are replaced with no ball at the apex. Additional rules apply when either ball is in the position where the balls would usually be racked.

Highest runs
In straight pool, skilled players can pot all of the balls in a single rack and continue to do so for large runs. On March 19, 1954, Willie Mosconi set a record-high run of 526 points over 36 racks. Mosconi had been playing a -to-200-points match against an amateur player called Earl Bruney in Springfield, Ohio. Bruney scored the first three points in the match, but Mosconi ran the next 200 points to win. However, Mosconi continued the run for over two hours to score 526 before missing a fine . The run was witnessed by 300 people, including a lawyer who produced an affidavit to confirm it took place, and it was later confirmed by the Billiard Congress of America.

Mosconi's record for the highest documented run stood for over 65 years. It was finally beaten on May 27, 2019, when John Schmidt ran 626 balls in Monterey, California, which was the result of a sustained, months-long effort to break Mosconi's record. Critics have argued that Mosconi's record was made in competition while Schmidt simply set up break shots for himself, and that his video was never released. 
In similar fashion as Schmidt, on January 18, 2022 as part of the "Legends of Pocket Billiards" high run series, Jayson Shaw completed a 51 rack, record breaking run of 714 balls, which, upon video review, was amended to 669 balls following a touched ball foul when he was bridging over another ball.

Tournaments and governance
Straight pool is governed by regional councils such as the European Pocket Billiard Federation, and at a worldwide level by the World Pool Association. The World Straight Pool Championship was created in 1912 and ran sporadically until 1990. In 2006, the championship was revived, until again ending in 2010. A straight pool event has been played at the European Pool Championships annually since 1980. The U.S. Open Straight Pool Championship was sanctioned by the Billiard Congress of America (BCA) from 1966 to 2000; It was revived by CueSports International (CSI) for one year in 2007 and afterwards was held annually from 2016, until again ending in 2019.

The game has been in decline since the 1980s; players in the United States have often called straight pool "dead". Popularity of the game has been reduced due to the popularity of other pool games such as nine-ball and eight-ball, and a lack of straight pool competitions.

In popular culture
Straight pool has been featured in popular culture, most notably in the 1956 novel The Hustler and its 1961 film adaptation. It also provides the setting and background for John O'Hara's monologue short story, "Straight Pool."

Straight pool, in common with other pool games, has been associated with hustling. The Twilight Zone produced an episode titled "A Game of Pool" in 1961, and remade in 1989 with a straight pool player being revived from the afterlife to compete in one last match.

Notes

References

External links
WPA world standardized rules for straight pool

Pool (cue sports)

it:Palla 8#Continuous 125 Pool